Zhao Yijing (born 7 February 1989) is a Chinese former tennis player.

On 11 June 2012, she reached her career-high WTA singles ranking of world No. 244. On 9 July 2012, she peaked at No. 222 in the doubles rankings. Zhao won four singles and nine doubles titles on the ITF Women's Circuit.

Career
Zhao was accepted as a wild card into the qualifying of the 2011 Guangzhou International Women's Open, where she defeated eighth seed Hsu Wen-hsin and second seed Mădălina Gojnea. In the main draw, she defeated Misaki Doi in the first round, 6–4, 6–3. This was her first WTA main-draw appearance. In the second round she lost to Tetiana Luzhanska in three sets. After this performance, she rose 92 ranks to 345. She then also reached the final of a $10k event, losing to Luksika Kumkhum, leaving her end of year ranking at 318, an increase of 538 ranks from 2010.

In 2012, Zhao started off the year playing ITF events in China, losing in the first round of the Blossom Cup, then moving on to win both the singles and doubles in Pingguo.

ITF Circuit finals

Singles: 6 (4–2)

Doubles: 17 (9–8)

References

External links
 
 

1989 births
Living people
Chinese female tennis players
Tennis players from Liaoning